The Daxi Wood Art Ecomuseum is a museum complex in Daxi District, Taoyuan City, Taiwan. The idea of ecomuseum is based on Scandinavian concept which emphasizes the integration between local communities and the preservation of cultural assets.

History
The establishment of this museum started with the renovation of building in the area and incorporated them with the local old streets which was initiated in 1996. The first museum building opened to the public is the Number One Hall, a Japanese-style house constructed in the 1920s. It was also the residence for the principle of Daxi Elementary School. The previous owner of the house, Mr.  Mao-Lin Chen and his wife Mrs. Cui-Wu Chen-Wang used to teach tailoring classes at the house. The banner hung high up above the front door that reads "Xiguang Tailoring Class" brings back many memories for the women of Daxi. Converted from a private residence to a public space, this old house has been imbued with new life.

In 2014, the museum building underwent renovation. In 2015, the renovation of the first hall and Wude Temple were completed and the two buildings were reopened. In 2016, the Craftsman Story House and the Crafts Exchange Hall were also reopened.

Architecture
The museum complex is divided into the Daxi Wood Art Industry and Daxi Resident Lifestyle. Public buildings include martial arts training center Butokuden and a cluster of 22 Japanese style buildings. The buildings are renovated in different stages according to their age, which will also incorporate the local historical streets and houses to convert Daxi to a cultural museum.

Notable buildings are:
 Daxi Butokuden
 Lee Teng-fan's Ancient Residence

See also
 List of museums in Taiwan

References

External links

 
 

1996 establishments in Taiwan
Art museums and galleries in Taiwan
Museums established in 1996
Museums in Taoyuan City
Wood